

The Bleriot-SPAD S.26 was a seaplace racer aircraft built in the late 1910s.

Design
The S.26 was a biplane with a monocoque fuselage of wood and canvas construction as well as floats. Although intended to take part in the 1919 Schneider Cup, a puncture in one of the floats during flight testing eliminated it from the Schneider Cup.

Specifications

See also

References

SPAD aircraft
Biplanes
Single-engined tractor aircraft
Aircraft first flown in 1919